Carpenter Bridge may refer to:
Carpenter Bridge (Ohio River)
Carpenter Bridge (Massachusetts)
Carpenters Bridge, Delaware